The Zenyatta Stakes  is a Grade II American Thoroughbred horse race for fillies and mares, age three and older the distance of one and one-sixteenth miles on the dirt scheduled annually in September at Santa Anita Park in Arcadia, California.  The event currently carries a purse of $200,000.

History

The event was named after Hall of Famer Lady's Secret  who had won the 1986 Breeders' Cup Distaff at Santa Anita Park.

The event was inaugurated on 11 October 1993 as the Lady's Secret Handicap and was won by the odds-on favorite Hollywood Wildcat who was ridden by US Hall of Fame jockey Eddie Delahoussaye in a time of 1:41.05. In her following start Hollywood Wildcat won the Breeders' Cup Distaff at Santa Anita Park. The following year Hollywood Wildcat repeated her victory leading all the way to a comfortable  length margin. 

After two runnings of the event was classified by the American Graded Stakes Committee as Grade III and was upgraded to Grade II status in 1996. In 2007 the event was upgraded to Grade I.

After the 2009 running, it was announced that the race would be renamed the Zenyatta Stakes, on the assumption that Zenyatta (who had won the race in 2008 and 2009) would retire at the end of 2009. That change, however, was held off for 2010 at the behest of the mare's connections. For 2010, it was again run as the Lady's Secret Stakes because Zenyatta was in the field, winning the race for the third time. The race was again run as the Lady's Secret Stakes in 2011 but was then run under its new name in 2012.

Beholder was able to equal Zenyatta's record of winning the event three times in 2015. After winning the 2012 Breeders' Cup Juvenile Fillies at Santa Anita, Beholder won this event as a three-year-old before winning the Breeders' Cup Distaff which also was held at Santa Anita. After winning this event in 2014 and 2015 Beholder did not enter the Breeder's Cup. In the 2016 running of the event, Beholder ran for the fourth time and was beaten by a nose by Stellar Wind, however she turned the tables winning the Breeders' Cup Distaff for a second time in her last career start.

In 2019 the event was downgraded to Grade II.

Records
Speed record:
 1:40.30 - Zenyatta (2008)

Margins:
 lengths – Azeri (2002)
 lengths – Zenyatta (2008)

Most wins:
 3 - Zenyatta (2008, 2009, 2010)
 3 - Beholder (2013, 2014, 2015)

Most wins by a jockey:
 5 - Mike E. Smith (2002, 2008, 2009, 2010, 2014)

Most wins by a trainer:
 5 - Bob Baffert (1998, 2007, 2018, 2021, 2022)

Most wins by an owner:
 4 - Ann & Jerry Moss (2008, 2009, 2010, 2011)

Winners

Legend:

 
 

Notes:
§ Ran as an entry

See also
List of American and Canadian Graded races

External links
 Oak Tree Honors Zenyatta with Grade 1 race

References

Mile category horse races for fillies and mares
Horse races in California
Grade 2 stakes races in the United States
Breeders' Cup Challenge series
Recurring sporting events established in 1993
Santa Anita Park
1993 establishments in California